The A. H. Buchan Company Building, also known as Supreme Lighting, is a historic tobacco processing facility located at Mullins, Marion County, South Carolina. It was built between 1924 and 1930, and is a two-story, brick building. It features a stepped parapet on the façade. The building was used for the purpose of buying, drying and exporting tobacco. The A. H. Buchan Company operated in this building until 1964.

It was listed in the National Register of Historic Places in 1984.

References

Commercial buildings on the National Register of Historic Places in South Carolina
Buildings and structures in Marion County, South Carolina
Warehouses on the National Register of Historic Places
Commercial buildings completed in 1930
Industrial buildings and structures on the National Register of Historic Places in South Carolina
National Register of Historic Places in Marion County, South Carolina
Tobacco buildings in the United States